John Henry Upshur (5 December 1823 – 30 May 1917) was an admiral in the United States Navy who served during the Mexican–American War and the American Civil War.

Early life
Upshur—born John Henry Nottingham  in Northampton County, Virginia December 5, 1823 changed his name at the request of his mother to her maiden name Upshur gratifying her wish, as the Upshur family was conspicuous in naval annals. He was appointed a midshipman on 4 November 1841 and initially served at sea with the Mediterranean Squadron. During the war with Mexico, Upshur was assigned to St. Mary's as that brig participated in operations against Tampico. He also served ashore with the naval battery during the attacks against Vera Cruz in March 1847.

In the years preceding the Civil War, Upshur carried out assignments in the Mediterranean, the West Indian, and the African Squadrons. He also performed brief tours of duty at the Naval Academy and at the Washington Navy Yard as an ordnance officer. From 1853 to 1856, Upshur served in Supply during Commodore Matthew Calbraith Perry's expeditions to Japan which opened that nation to the west.

Civil War
Unlike cousin Robert E. Lee Upshur stayed with the Union military during the American Civil War, resisting much family pressure to choose the Confederacy. He was assigned to the North Atlantic Blockading Squadron, and participated in the capture of the Southern forts at Hatteras Inlet 1861 which opened the North Carolina sounds to Union forces. Upshur was executive officer of Wabash during the expedition which wrested Port Royal, South Carolina, from Confederate hands. He also commanded four boats in Commander C. R. P Rodgers's expedition in the inland coast waters in the vicinity of Port Royal and Beaufort, South Carolina. Later on, Upshur served in the South Atlantic Blockading Squadron in charge of the steamer  during operations against Charleston. He returned to the North Atlantic Blockading Squadron in time for the abortive joint expedition against Fort Fisher late in December 1864. Upshur was in the expedition which finally carried the Southern works guarding Wilmington in mid-January 1865.

Post Civil War
After the Civil War, Upshur served in a succession of sea and shore billets, promoted to commander, 25 July 1866, and given the USS Frolic, on the Mediterranean station, in 1865–1867. Promoted to captain, 31 January 1872, he served as a member of the board of inspectors in 1877–1880. He had a leave of absence, during which he visited Europe, in 1880, and upon his return was a member of the board of examiners. Ending his service as commander of the Pacific Squadron from 1882 to 1885. Rear Admiral Upshur retired on 1 June 1885 and died in Washington, D.C.

He commissioned the building in 1884, with design by architect Frederick C. Withers, a Queen Anne home, later known as United States Daughters of 1812, National Headquarters.

Namesake
USS Upshur (DD-144) was named for him. The second USS Upshur (T-AP-198) was named for Major General William Peterkin Upshur, USMC.

See also

References

1823 births
1917 deaths
Union Navy officers
United States Navy admirals
United States Navy personnel of the Mexican–American War
People of Virginia in the American Civil War
People from Northampton County, Virginia